Indonesian National Route 9 is a main road which connects Ajibarang and Secang. The route is a middle route which passes Dieng Plateau and located in Central Java.

Route
Ajibarang - Purwokerto - Sokaraja - Kaliori - Banyumas - Klampok - Banjarnegara - Selokromo - Wonosobo - Kretek - Parakan - Bulu - Kedu - Temanggung - Kranggan - Secang

References

9
Transport in Central Java